Church of the Firstborn or Church of the First Born may refer to:

"Morrisite" Latter Day Saint sect
Church of the Firstborn (Morrisite), a Latter Day Saint sect formed in 1861 and extant until 1969

LeBaron Mormon fundamentalist group factions
Church of the Firstborn (LeBaron family)
Church of the Firstborn of the Fulness of Times, a Latter Day Saint sect formed in the 1950s by Joel LeBaron
Church of the First Born of the Lamb of God, founded in 1972 by Ervil LeBaron

Dalton Mormon fundamentalist group
Church of the First Born and General Assembly of Heaven, a Latter Day Saint sect formed by Terrill Dalton in 2004

See also
General Assembly and Church of the First Born